Déjà Vu (stylized as deja-vu) is the fourteenth studio album by Italian DJ Giorgio Moroder: his first album, after a 23-years hiatus, since Forever Dancing (1992). It was released on 12 June 2015, and features collaborations with: Kylie Minogue, Sia, Britney Spears, Kelis, Charli XCX, Mikky Ekko, Foxes and Matthew Koma, among others. On 20 January 2015, the collaboration with Kylie Minogue, "Right Here, Right Now", was officially released, along with a video teaser.

Background
Moroder contributed to Daft Punk's 2013 studio album Random Access Memories, admitting that he had been a fan of their song "One More Time" before working with the group. His voice and story is featured on the album's track "Giorgio by Moroder". On the track he states, "My name is Giovanni Giorgio, but everybody calls me Giorgio."

In summer 2013, Giorgio started to DJ, making his US debut at the Red Bull Music Academy in New York City. He toured around the world, playing his classics from the '70s and '80s as well as new remixes.

In 2014, Giorgio Moroder reworked a song of his own from the '60s called "Doo Bee Doo" (2014 version), which was used in the 2014 Volkswagen Super Bowl commercial titled "Wings".

In March 2014, singer Kelis announced a collaboration with Moroder on her Facebook page. The following month, Moroder released his official remix of Coldplay's "Midnight" from their album Ghost Stories. He also announced that he will work with the French electro-pop producer Madeon, and American singer Lana Del Rey.

On 9 June 2014, Adult Swim released a Hi-NRG disco single by Moroder called "Giorgio's Theme". Moroder also remixed Tony Bennett and Lady Gaga's rendition of "I Can't Give You Anything but Love".

In November 2014, it was announced that Déjà Vu featuring contributions from Britney Spears, Kylie Minogue, Sia, Charli XCX, Mikky Ekko, Foxes, Matthew Koma, among others was being put together.

Critical reception

Déjà Vu received mixed reviews from music critics. At Metacritic, which assigns a normalized rating out of 100 to reviews from mainstream critics, the album received an average score of 54 based on 25 reviews, which indicates "mixed or average reviews".

Singles
"74 Is the New 24", an instrumental song, served as the album's lead single released on 11 November 2014.

"Right Here, Right Now" featuring Kylie Minogue was released worldwide as the  second single on 20 January and was accompanied by a music video on Moroder's Vevo channel. The single was a success, managing to top the Billboard Hot Dance Club Songs chart and the Argentinian Singles Chart. The song was also performed with Moroder on Minogue's Kiss Me Once Tour in Australia.

"Déjà Vu" featuring Sia served as the third single. It single was released worldwide on 17 April 2015 and was accompanied by a music video, also uploaded on Moroder's Vevo. Despite having limited success in Europe, the single was successful in the US, reaching number one on the Billboard Dance chart. The tracks "Diamonds" (featuring Charli XCX) and "Don't Let Go" (featuring Mikky Ekko) were made available in the pre-order of the album, on May 13, 2015, a few days after the leak of both.

"Tom's Diner" featuring Britney Spears was released as the fourth and final single on 9 October 2015.

Track listing

Notes
 signifies a co-producer
 signifies a vocal producer

Personnel

Performers
 Giorgio Moroder – vocals, programming, keyboards 
 Sia – vocals
 Charli XCX – vocals
 Mikky Ekko – vocals
 Kylie Minogue – vocals
 Matthew Koma – vocals
 Britney Spears – vocals
 Foxes – vocals
 Kelis – vocals
 Marlene – vocals

Technical
 Production – Giorgio Moroder
 Executive production – Michael "Smidi" Smith
 Mixing – Mitch McCarthy
 Mixing – Manny Marroquin 
 Mastering – Matthew Gray (Matthew Gray Mastering, Australia)

Charts

Release history

References

2015 albums
Giorgio Moroder albums
RCA Records albums